Stomopteryx frivola is a moth of the family Gelechiidae. It was described by Edward Meyrick in 1926. It is found in South Africa.

The forewings are violet grey sprinkled with blackish. The stigmata form small cloudy darker spots followed by slight whitish-grey-ochreous scales, the discal approximated and the plical obliquely before the first discal. There is an irregular whitish angulated transverse line at three-fourths, tinged with greyish ochreous in the disc, on the costa forming a small spot. The hindwings are grey.

References

Endemic moths of South Africa
Moths described in 1926
Stomopteryx